The Agrarian People's Union (ZNS), until 2006 known as the Bulgarian Agrarian People's Union – People's Union (Balgarski Zemedelski Naroden Sajuz – Naroden Sajuz, BZNS-NS), is a conservative agrarian party in Bulgaria.

It was founded in 1996 by a faction of the Bulgarian Agrarian People's Union led by Anastasia Dimitrova-Moser. It contested the parliamentary election in 1997 and 2001 within the center-right United Democratic Forces. In 2005 it was part of the Bulgarian People's Union, that won at the legislative elections, 25 June 2005, 5.7% of the popular vote and 13 out of 240 seats.

A considerable group around the former party leader Anastasia Dimitrova-Moser left the ZNS in 2008 and founded the United Agrarians.

The party is a former observer of the Centrist Democrat International (CDI).

External links
Official website

Conservative parties in Bulgaria
Agrarian parties in Bulgaria